The Archimedes Principle is a 2004 film directed by Gerardo Herrero and written by Belén Gopegui which stars Marta Belaustegui, Roberto Enríquez, Alberto Jiménez and Blanca Oteyza. The plot is set in 21st-century Madrid.

Cast

See also
 List of Spanish films of 2004

References

External links
 .

2004 films
2004 drama films
2000s Spanish-language films
Films directed by Gerardo Herrero
Spanish drama films
Films scored by Lucio Godoy
Films set in Madrid
Tornasol Films films
2000s Spanish films